John George was a Negro league infielder in the 1920s.

George made his Negro leagues debut in 1920 with the St. Louis Giants. He went on to play for the Chicago American Giants, and finished his career in 1924 with the Harrisburg Giants and the Bacharach Giants.

References

External links
 and Seamheads

Place of birth missing
Place of death missing
Year of birth missing
Year of death missing
Bacharach Giants players
Chicago American Giants players
Harrisburg Giants players
St. Louis Giants players
Baseball infielders